Niederfinow station is a railway station in the municipality of Niederfinow, located in the Barnim district in Brandenburg, Germany.

References

Railway stations in Brandenburg
Buildings and structures in Barnim